Siva Sthalams are sacred Hindu temples for Siva, which total to 275 temples across the Indian subcontinent.

Categories 
The temples are classified by various scholars in several different ways. Categorized by geography, the temples are located throughout:
 Chola Nadu - North of Kaveri (63 temples)
 Chola Nadu - South of Kaveri (128 temples) 
 Eezha Nadu - Sri Lanka (2 temples) 
 Pandya Nadu (14 temples) 
 Malai Nadu - Kerala (1 temple) 
 Kongu Nadu (7 temples) 
 Nadu Nadu (22 temples) 
 Tondai Nadu (32 temples) 
 Tulava Nadu - Karnataka (1 temple) 
 Vada Nadu (5 temples) 
 Kailash Parvat (1 temple)

External links 

Siva Sthalams at Vedagnana

Hindu temples